The Riverfront Apartments is a  tall high-rise building located at 245 North Summit Street in Downtown Toledo. It stood as Toledo's tallest building for 17 years, from its completion in 1913 until the completion of the PNC Bank Building in 1930. The Riverfront Apartments building is currently the fifth-tallest building in Toledo.

History 
The twenty-one story structure was constructed in 1912-13 for the Second National Bank on the southwest corner of Summit Street and Madison Avenue in Toledo's business center. The bank planned to occupy the lower floors and the upper floors were designed as office space. The general contractor for the building was The A. Bentley & Sons Company, Toledo, Ohio, and the architects are D. H. Burnham & Company, of Chicago, Ill.

The building was originally known as the Second National Bank Building from the time of its construction in 1913 until the bank merged with Toledo Trust. From the 1930s until 1981 the building was the headquarters of the Toledo Trust bank and it was known as the Toledo Trust Building. The local bank moved its headquarters across Summit Street into its new triangular-shaped granite and glass building in 1981.
  
The old Toledo Trust building was purchased in 1998 by the Eyde Co., in a $4.5 million package deal that included the Tower on the Maumee and the adjacent parking garage. The office building was converted to apartments in 1999 and renamed the Riverfront Apartments.

See also
List of tallest buildings in Toledo, Ohio

References 

Skyscrapers in Ohio
Residential buildings completed in 1913
Buildings and structures in Toledo, Ohio